Anna Thangi may refer to:

 Anna Thangi (1958 film), an Indian Kannada-language film
 Anna Thangi (2005 film), an Indian Kannada-language drama film
 Anna Thangi (TV series), an Indian Kannada-language soap opera